Emesis lucinda (white-patched emesis or lucinda metalmark) is a butterfly of the family Riodinidae. It is found from Mexico to Bolivia and in Suriname, French Guiana and Brazil.

The wingspan is about 36 mm.

Subspecies
Emesis aurimna, Emesis eurydice, Emesis castigata, Emesis fastidiosa, Emesis glaucescens, Emesis liodes  and Emesis spreta  were all treated as subspecies of Emesis lucinda, but are now considered full species.

References

Riodininae
Riodinidae of South America
Butterflies described in 1775
Taxa named by Pieter Cramer